, stylized as i tell c, is a Japanese manga series written and illustrated by Kazusa Inaoka. It was serialized in Shueisha's Weekly Shōnen Jump magazine from February to June 2021, with its chapters collected into three tankōbon volumes.

Publication
The series is written and illustrated by Kazusa Inaoka. It was serialized in Shueisha's Weekly Shōnen Jump magazine from February 1 to June 28, 2021. Shueisha collected its chapters into three tankōbon volumes, released from April 30 to September 3, 2021.

Viz Media and Manga Plus published chapters of the series simultaneously with the Japanese release. Viz Media will release digital volumes in Summer 2022.

Volume list

References

Further reading

External links
  
 
 
 

Comedy anime and manga
Crime in anime and manga
Mystery anime and manga
Shōnen manga
Shueisha manga
Suspense anime and manga
Viz Media manga